The Rolleiflex SL66 is a medium format single lens reflex camera made by Rollei, in regular production from 1966–82. Although Rollei never officially discontinued the Rollei SL66, it was removed from their promotional support and dealer catalogs in the UK from 1976 and for all intents and purposes was replaced by the Rolleiflex SLX. The UK importer was Rollei themselves.  The Rolleiflex SL66 did not feature in Rollei's worldwide product catalog in 1980, and the US importer's July 1979 dealer price list has no SL66 cameras nor 40mm, 250mm, or 500mm lenses. This strongly suggests that the camera was effectively discontinued from 1976 until the launch of the SL66E in October 1982 after the restart of camera production following the first bankruptcy. 

The SL66 represented a change in direction for Rollei, which until that time had focused almost exclusively on its popular twin lens reflex cameras, the Rolleiflex and Rolleicord.

History 
In 1957, a gentlemen's agreement between Reinhold Heidecke, inventor of the Rolleiflex TLR, and Victor Hasselblad, inventor of the Hasselblad SLR, was reached to ensure that Rollei would not manufacture SLR cameras, and Hasselblad would not manufacture TLR cameras. However, the rapid adoption of SLRs during the 1960s meant that Rollei risked falling behind in this market at a time when demand for TLRs was decreasing. In 1964 plans were made to create a new, technologically advanced SLR to be introduced at the 1966 photokina festival.

Features 
Like the Rolleiflex TLR and the Hasselblad SLR, the SL66 uses 120 or 220 film to produce frames of 6×6  cm. It also incorporates several features that are unique or noteworthy in an SLR camera:
 Reverse-mounting lenses. Most SL66 lenses (with the exception of the very wide or very long lenses) could be reversed and mounted to the camera without adapters, for use in close-up macro photography. 
 Lens bellows to accommodate focusing when the lenses are reverse-mounted. Again, this is impossible for most SLR cameras without special adapters.
 Lens tilt movement. The lenses could be tilted up to 8 degrees either up or down, to take advantage of the Scheimpflug principle, enabling greater depth of field, especially in close-up photographs.

The SL66 uses a focal-plane shutter, although an 80mm lens and a 150mm lens were available from January 1970 with leaf shutters to enable much higher flash synchronization speeds up to 1/500 second, the shutter needed manual cocking before each exposure which is not particularly convenient.

Several later cameras based on the SL66 were made, including the SL66E, SL66X, and SL66SE. The most prominent changes in these newer models involved increased use of electronics in metering and flash synchronization. The SL66SE remained in production until 1992.

External links

Rolleiflex SL66 website (Information about all Rolleiflex SL66 camera models, lenses and accessories)
Rolleiflex SL 66 (by Ferdi Stutterheim)
DW Photo (Manufacturer of the modern medium format Rolleiflex cameras and repair) English and German
Paepke Fototechnik (Repair and maintenance of Rolleiflex cameras and other Rollei equipment) English and German
Rollei Repairs by Harry Fleenor (Repair and maintenance for Rolleiflex TLR cameras)
Rolleiflex SL66 Repair Shops World Wide (by Ferdi Stutterheim)
International Rollei Club (Largest Rollei website with details of all Rolleiflex equipment ever made)
Club Rollei User (Club for all Users, Collectors and Enthusiasts of Rollei photography)

SL66